Cell to Singularity is an incremental game developed and published by Computer Lunch. An exploration of evolution, naturalism, and civilization, the game uses idle mechanics to help players learn about science and history. Cell to Singularity is an example of a game that uses the freemium model; while the game is free and can be played without spending money, players can buy special "boosts" or in-game currency that will help them to clear difficult levels.

Gameplay 
The game begins with a view of the Earth from space. Players must use their fingers or mouse to tap on the Hadean Earth; tapping generates Entropy Points. After tapping some points, the Tech Tree of Life is then unlocked. Entropies are used to unlock upgrades and generators. Generators are part of the tech tree that are used to automatically generate Entropy. Which are then used to unlock new developments in Earth’s history. The player progresses further through different eras of Earth’s history as they unlock more of these upgrades.  When the planet and its organisms evolve, visual changes occur in 3D modeled "gardens" where the player can view the creatures and developments that they’ve purchased.

Evolving homo sapiens unlocks a new currency for the player called Idea Points. Players gain currencies continuously, with the simulation continuing to earn points even while the game is offline. Occasionally, "boosts" may become available, which allow the player to gain a small advantage in the game.  This premium currency, purple cubes of a fictional substance called "Darwinium" (named after Charles Darwin) can be obtained via in-app purchase or through in-game events or achievements.

Players will eventually reach the point of creating a technological singularity in the civilization tree. This activates an upgrade that causes the game to “crash” and restart from the beginning. This is, in reality, a prestige mechanic: the players’ earned Entropy and Idea Points are converted into a new currency called MetaBits, which are used to upgrade the simulation and unlock new areas of study.

Expansions 
 Mesozoic Valley – Branching off of the main tech tree is the Mesozoic Valley, a separate simulation featuring the evolution and eventual extinction of the dinosaurs. Released in December 2019, this expansion added 50 new levels to the game and introduced new gameplay, including Trait Cards which can be used to upgrade individual creatures.
 The Beyond – The second expansion of Cell to Singularity, the space-themed Beyond, was released on November 6, 2021. The launch of the expansion was marked by an in-game event where players tapped on a black hole icon. This milestone was reached after four days, and the simulation became available to play.

History 
Cell to Singularity began development in 2017, inspired by Computer Lunch co-founder Andrew Garrahan’s love of nature documentaries. Wanting to create a game about science and history, Garrahan saw the emergent popularity of the incremental game genre as a good fit for the more relaxed pace of a documentary. Garrahan was also inspired by James Burke’s “Connections” series for the BBC.

The game was initially released in early access on Android in 2018. It was later also released in early access on iOS and Steam. The game was officially released on iOS in August 2019, and Android in April 2020. Finally, it left Steam Early Access in November 2021.

Exploration Events 
Cell to Singularity is still in active development, with updates releasing regularly. Beginning in late 2021, limited time events, called "Explorations," have been added to the game. These feature miniature simulations about specific topics in science, technology, and the humanities. All six planned Exploration events are released, these include:

 Unfold The Universe – Explores the James Webb Space Telescope and the detailed history and mission of the telescope. This event coincided with the launch of the said telescope.
 Fungus Among Us – Explores the entangled world of Fungi, its properties and types.
 The Big Questions – Explores philosophy and its questions.
 Life After Apocalypse – Explores the extinction events, which occurred in Earth history and shows what would happen if all humans die.
 The Price Of Trust – Explores money, and its history.
 A Coevolution Love Story - Explores pollination and the codependency between bees and flowers

Reception 
Katherine Franklin of BigBossBattle.com called the game, "a commendable delve into a fun representation of evolution on (and off) Earth."

Early reviews praised the game’s atmosphere, with one from BlueMoonGames.com declaring, "The visual presentation makes the game feel like an interactive animated educational tutorial through the [historical] periods described."

Michael Zegar of GamePressure.com compared the game favorably to Spore, Cookie Clicker, and Plague Inc.

The Beyond expansion, released in November 2021, also received positive reviews. Catherine Ng Dellosa of PocketGamer.com called it, "...a refreshing change of pace from the numerous mobile titles out in the market today."

The game has a 4.7 rating on the Google Play Store, a 4.8 rating on the iOS App Store, and a positive review rating on Steam  based on over 9,000 reviews. It was picked as an "Editor's Choice" game on the Google Play Store in June 2020.

While the majority of the reception to the game has been positive, it has been criticized by some for its simple low-poly graphics, lack of branching narrative options, and slow update schedule. Many negative reviews of the game stem from distaste for its use of incremental mechanics such as clicking.

References

External links
 Official website

2018 video games
Android (operating system) games
Biological simulation video games
Browser games
Dinosaurs in video games
Free online games
Incremental games
IOS games
MacOS games
Single-player video games
Singularitarianism
Video games about evolution
Video games about virtual reality
Video games developed in the United States
Windows games